The 2011–12 Russian Bandy Super League was the 20e season of the present highest Russian men's bandy top division, Russian Bandy Super League. The regular season began on 10 November 2011, and the final was played in Arkhangelsk on 25 March 2012.

Teams

References

 http://www.rusbandy.ru/

2012 in Russian sport
2011 in Russian sport
2012 in bandy
2011 in bandy
Seasons in Russian bandy